The Immediate Geographic Region of Itabira is one of the 10 immediate geographic regions in the Intermediate Geographic Region of Belo Horizonte, one of the 70 immediate geographic regions in the Brazilian state of Minas Gerais and one of the 509 of Brazil, created by the National Institute of Geography and Statistics (IBGE) in 2017.

Municipalities 
It comprises 9 municipalities:

 Bom Jesus do Amparo    
 Carmésia       
 Ferros  
 Itabira     
 Itambé do Mato Dentro  
 Passabém   
 Santa Maria de Itabira  
 Santo Antônio do Rio Abaixo     
 São Sebastião do Rio Preto

References 

Geography of Minas Gerais